José Gonçalves may refer to:
José Gonçalves (footballer) (born 1985), Portuguese footballer
José Gonçalves (cyclist) (born 1989), Portuguese cyclist